Cantor's paradise is an expression used by  in describing set theory and infinite cardinal numbers developed by Georg Cantor. The context of Hilbert's comment was his opposition to what he saw as L. E. J. Brouwer's reductive attempts to circumscribe what kind of mathematics is acceptable; see Brouwer–Hilbert controversy.

References

Saharon Shelah. You can enter Cantor's paradise!  Paul Erdős and his mathematics, II (Budapest, 1999),  555–564, Bolyai Soc. Math. Stud., 11, János Bolyai Math. Soc., Budapest, 2002. 
Peckhaus, Volker. Fixing Cantor's paradise: the prehistory of Ernst Zermelo's axiomatization of set theory.  New approaches to classes and concepts,  11–22, Stud. Log. (Lond.), 14, Coll. Publ., London, 2008.
"About Cantor's Paradise". Medium. A Medium Corporation. Retrieved 24 January 2021.

Set theory
David Hilbert